This article lists political parties in Ecuador.
 
Ecuador has a multi-party system with numerous parties, in which usually no single party has a chance of gaining power alone, so parties must work with each other to form coalition governments.

Parties

See also
 List of political parties by country
 Liberalism and radicalism in Ecuador

References

Political parties
Ecuador
 
Political parties
Ecuador